Péter Szilvási (born 20 June 1994) is a Hungarian former football defender.

References

1994 births
Living people
People from Nyíregyháza
Hungarian footballers
Hungary youth international footballers
Hungary under-21 international footballers
Association football defenders
SpVgg Greuther Fürth II players
Debreceni VSC players
Mezőkövesdi SE footballers
Gyirmót FC Győr players
Szeged-Csanád Grosics Akadémia footballers
Regionalliga players
Nemzeti Bajnokság I players
Nemzeti Bajnokság II players
Hungarian expatriate footballers
Expatriate footballers in Germany
Hungarian expatriate sportspeople in Germany
Sportspeople from Szabolcs-Szatmár-Bereg County